Kaeng Hang Maeo is the northwesternmost district (amphoe) of Chanthaburi province, eastern Thailand.

Geography
Neighboring districts are (from the east clockwise) Soi Dao, Khao Khitchakut, Tha Mai, Na Yai Am of Chanthaburi Province, Klaeng, Khao Chamao of Rayong province, Bo Thong of Chonburi province, Tha Takiap of Chachoengsao province and Wang Sombun of Sa Kaeo province.

History
The minor district (king amphoe) Kaeng Hang Maeo was established on 1 April 1990 by splitting off five tambon from Tha Mai district. It was upgraded to a full district on 8 September 1992.

Administration
The district is divided into five sub-districts (tambons), which are further subdivided into 62 villages (mubans). There are no municipal (thesabans). There are five tambon administrative organizations (TAO).

References

External links
amphoe.com

Kaeng Hang Maeo